Denvir is a surname. Notable people with the surname include:

 The Most Reverend Cornelius Denvir DD (1791–1865), Irish Roman Catholic prelate, mathematician, and natural philosopher
 John Denvir (American football) (born John William Denvir), American football player
 John Denvir (soldier) DCM (1913–1973), New Zealand soldier
 Kieran Denvir (1932–2022), Gaelic footballer from Northern Ireland
 Tim Denvir (born 1939), British software engineer

See also
 Laura Denvir Stith (born 1953), American judge on the Supreme Court of Missouri